Dalaba Frith Glick Rieman Kihlstedt, also stylized as DalabaFrithGlickRiemanKihlstedt, is a 2003 studio album of improvised experimental music by Lesli Dalaba, Fred Frith, Eric Glick Rieman and Carla Kihlstedt. It was recorded at Guerrilla Recording in Oakland, California, and was released by Accretions Records in San Diego, California in 2003.

The quartet was first proposed by Glick Rieman to Frith, with whom he had worked at Mills College in Oakland. Frith added Dalaba to the project, and Glick Rieman, Frith and Dalaba performed with John Zorn at Derek Bailey's Incus Festival at Tonic in New York City. Kihlstedt joined the trio later at the suggestion of Glick Rieman, and the quartet's first performance was at Myles Boisen's Guerrilla Recording studio in Oakland.

Reception

In a review of the album at AllMusic, François Couture wrote that there is "[a] beautiful level of understanding" between the four musicians, and that while the music is improvised, it "sounds deeply structured". He praised "Worm Anvils", which he described as "long, slow, delicate, and full of mesmerizing sounds, courtesy of Glick Rieman". Couture felt that while this album is not as "absorbing" as other Frith collaborative albums from the time, for example Digital Wildlife with Maybe Monday, it "still provides a very rewarding listen".

Frank Rubolino in All About Jazz called the album an "eclectic mirage" with "animated gaiety countered with sadness", and moods swinging from "stark depression to overt jubilation". Writing in Exposé, Jeff Melton described the album as "seven dialogs ... each winding up in a dark alley alone with no explanation". He felt the strongest track was "Shallow Weather", with its "Derek Bailey styled introduction into a jazz malaise". Melton said fans of Frith's collaborations with Chris Cutler will appreciate this recording.

Track listing
All music by Lesli Dalaba, Fred Frith, Eric Glick Rieman and Carla Kihlstedt.

Sources: Liner notes, Discogs, Fred Frith discography.

Personnel
Lesli Dalaba – trumpet
Fred Frith – guitar, maniacal laughter
Eric Glick Rieman – prepared and extended Rhodes electric piano
Carla Kihlstedt – violin, electric violin, Stroh violin

Sources: Liner notes, Discogs, Fred Frith discography.

Sound and artwork
Recorded and mixed at Guerrilla Recording, Oakland, California
Engineered and mixed by Myles Boisen
Mastered by Jeff Karsin
Produced by Eric Glick Rieman
Painting by Shelley Hoyt
Design by Marcos Fernandes

Sources: Liner notes, Discogs.

References

External links
Dalaba Frith Glick Rieman Kihlstedt reviews at Accretions Records

2003 albums
Collaborative albums
Experimental music albums
Free improvisation albums
Fred Frith albums